Nobody Wanted to Die is a 1966 Lithuanian film made in Soviet Lithuania and directed by Vytautas Žalakevičius. Žalakevičius, actor Donatas Banionis, and cinematographer Jonas Gricius were awarded USSR State Prize for the film in 1967.

Cast
 Kazimieras Vitkus as Father
 Regimantas Adomaitis as Donatas
 Bruno Oja as Bronius
 Juozas Budraitis as Jonas
 Algimantas Masiulis as Mykolas
 Donatas Banionis as Chairman Vaitkus
 Vija Artmane as Ona

References

External links

1966 films
1966 in the Soviet Union
Soviet-era Lithuanian films
Lithuanian drama films
Lithuanian black-and-white films
Soviet black-and-white films